The 2019 U.S. National Gymnastics Championships was the 56th edition of the U.S. National Gymnastics Championships. The competition was held from August 8–11, 2019 at the Sprint Center in Kansas City, Missouri.

Competition schedule 

The competition featured Senior and Junior competitions for both women's and men's disciplines. The preliminary competition schedule was as follows:

 Thursday, August 8: Men's gymnastics – 1 p.m., juniors, and 6:30 p.m., seniors
 Friday, August 9: Women's gymnastics – 1 p.m., juniors, and 6:30 p.m., seniors
 Saturday, August 10: Men's gymnastics – 1 p.m., juniors, and 6:30 p.m., seniors
 Sunday, August 11: Women's gymnastics – 1 p.m., juniors, and 6:30 p.m., seniors

Medalists

Women's national team
The top 6 all-around females automatically made the national team.  For juniors, Kayla DiCello, Konnor McClain, Olivia Greaves, Skye Blakely, Sydney Barros, and Ciena Alipio were the top 6 finishers.  Additionally Sophia Butler, eMjae Frazier, Lilly Lippeatt, and Anya Pilgrim were also added to the National Team.  For seniors the top six were Simone Biles, Sunisa Lee, Grace McCallum, Morgan Hurd, Leanne Wong, and Jordan Chiles.  Additionally Jade Carey, MyKayla Skinner, Trinity Thomas, Kara Eaker, and Riley McCusker were also added to the senior national team.

Women's participants 
The following individuals are participating in competition:

Seniors

 Simone Biles – Spring, Texas (World Champions Centre)
 Sloane Blakely – Frisco, Texas (WOGA)
 Jade Carey – Phoenix, Arizona (Arizona Sunrays)
 Jordan Chiles – Spring, Texas (World Champions Centre)
 Kara Eaker – Grain Valley, Missouri (GAGE)
 Aleah Finnegan – Lee's Summit, Missouri (GAGE)
 Morgan Hurd – Middletown, Delaware (First State)
 Shilese Jones – Westerville, Ohio (Future Gymnastics Academy)
 Emily Lee – Los Gatos, California (West Valley Gymnastics School)
 Sunisa Lee – St. Paul, Minnesota (Midwest Gymnastics Center)
 Grace McCallum – Isanti, Minnesota (Twin City Twisters)
 Riley McCusker – Brielle, New Jersey (MG Elite)
 Gabby Perea – Geneva, Illinois (Legacy Elite)
 MyKayla Skinner – Gilbert, Arizona (Desert Lights Gymnastics)
 Trinity Thomas – York, Pennsylvania (University of Florida)
 Faith Torrez – Pleasant Prairie, Wisconsin (Legacy Elite)
 Leanne Wong – Overland Park, Kansas (GAGE)

Juniors

 Ciena Alipio – San Jose, California (West Valley Gymnastics)
 Sydney Barros – Lewisville, Texas (Texas Dreams)
 Love Birt – Camden, Delaware (First State Gymnastics)
 Skye Blakely – Frisco, Texas (WOGA)
 Sophia Butler – Houston, Texas (Discover)
 Kailin Chio – Henderson, Nevada (Gymcats)
 Kayla DiCello – Boyds, Maryland (Hill's Gymnastics)
 Addison Fatta – Wrightsville, Pennsylvania (Prestige)
 eMjae Frazier – Erial, New Jersey (Parkettes)
 Karis German – Spring, Texas (World Champions Center)
 Olivia Greaves – Staten Island, New York (MG Elite)
 Levi Jung-Ruivivar – Woodland Hills, California (Paramount Elite)
 Lilly Lippeatt – Mason, Ohio (Cincinnati Gymnastics)
 Lauren Little – Mooresville, North Carolina (Everest Gymnastics)
 Nola Matthews – Gilroy, California (Airborne Gymnastics)
 Konnor McClain – Cross Lanes, West Virginia (Revolution Gymnastics)
 Zoe Miller – Spring, Texas (World Champions Centre)
 Kaylen Morgan – Huntersville, North Carolina (Everest Gymanstics)
 Sydney Morris – Bowie, Maryland (First State Gymnastics)
 Sophie Parenti – Menlo Park, California (San Mateo Gymnastics)
 Anya Pilgrim – Germantown, Maryland (Hill's Gymnastics)
 Ariel Posen – Manalapan, New Jersey (MG Elite)
 Sienna Robinson – Las Vegas, Nevada (Browns Gymanstics)
 Katelyn Rosen – Boerne, Texas (Mavericks at Artemovs)
 Lyden Saltness – Forest Lake, Minnesota (Midwest Gymnastics)
 Jamison Sears – Yorktown, Virginia (World Class Gymnastics)
 Ava Siegfeldt – Hampton, Virginia (World Class Gymnastics)
 Mya Witte – Greenacres, Florida (Genie's Gymnastics)
 Ella Zirbes – Stillwater, Minnesota (Flips Gymnastics)

References 

U.S. National Gymnastics Championships
Gymnastics in Missouri
Sports competitions in Kansas City, Missouri
U.S. Open
U.S. Open
U.S. Open
2010s in Kansas City, Missouri